Eremocossus asema is a moth in the family Cossidae. It was described by de Pungeler in 1899. It is found in Turkmenistan and possibly Iran.

References

Natural History Museum Lepidoptera generic names catalog

Cossinae
Moths described in 1899
Moths of Asia